Tallai is a suburb in the City of Gold Coast, Queensland, Australia.

Geography
Tallai is situated in the Gold Coast hinterland.

History
The median age of the Tallai population was 43 years, 6 years above the national median of 37.  65.8% of people living in Tallai were born in Australia. The other top responses for country of birth were England 8.3%, New Zealand 7.2%, South Africa 2.1%, Scotland 1.1%, Germany 0.7%. 86.9% of people spoke only English at home; the next most common languages were 1% German, 0.8% Italian, 0.6% French, 0.6% Japanese, 0.5% Spanish. 

Education 
There are no schools in Tallai. The nearest government primary schools are Mudgeeraba State School in neighbouring Mudgeeraba to the east, Mudgeeraba Creek State School in neighbouring Mudgeeraba to the south, and Gilston State School in neighbouring Gilston to the north-west. The nearest government secondary schools are Robina State High School in Robina to the east and Nerang State High School in Nerang to the north.

Amenities 
Tallai Country Golf Club has a 9-hole golf course at 22 The Panorama.

Mudgeeraba Lodge is an aged care facility at 21-25 Old Coach Road.

Parks 
There are a number of parks in the area:

 Frank Chaston Sporting Field
 Glenrowan Bush Reserve

 Grandview Terrace Parkland

 Hinze Dam Catchment - Numinbah Forest Reserve

 Imfeld Court Reserve

 Imfeld Court West Reserve

 Ingles Park

 Landlocked Park

 Liquidamber Court

 Michael L Ring Park

 Muller Park

 Otiose Reserve

 Range Road Reserve

 Sid Bigg Park

 Smith Park

 Tallai Rd Reserve

 Tallai Road South Reserve

 Viscount Road Reserves

References

External links

 

Suburbs of the Gold Coast, Queensland